Chen Lei (1917 – December 5, 2006) was a People's Republic of China politician. He was born in Huachuan County, Heilongjiang Province. He was governor of his home province two separate times.

References

1917 births
2006 deaths
People's Republic of China politicians from Heilongjiang
Chinese Communist Party politicians from Heilongjiang
Governors of Heilongjiang
CCP committee secretaries of Heilongjiang
People from Jiamusi
People of 88th Separate Rifle Brigade